Hydaticus pacificus, is a species of predaceous diving beetle found in South and South East Asia.

Subspecies
Three subspecies identified.

 Hydaticus pacificus andamanicus - India, Andaman Islands
 Hydaticus pacificus conspersus - Japan, Taiwan, China
 Hydaticus pacificus discindens - Sri Lanka
 Hydaticus pacificus lunatus - Malaysia, Philippines and Indonesia
 Hydaticus pacificus pacificus - India, Myanmar, Thailand, China, Cambodia, Laos, Vietnam, Malaysia, Singapore, Philippines, Indonesia

The nominate subspecies pacificus shows following features.

Body oblong-oval, moderately convex and broadest distinctly behind middle. Body length is about 14.1 to 16.6 mm. Head yellowish to reddish-brown in color. Some extended dark brown to black patches found along and between eyes and on vertex. Head with fine dense punctation and scattered stronger punctures and without microreticulation. Pronotum yellowish to reddish-brown with similar patches. Elytron dark brown to black with yellowish to reddish-brown. Elytra with very fine punctation and scattered stronger punctures; with fine microreticulation. Pronotum consists with very fine, dense punctation and scattered stronger punctures with traces of very fine microreticulation. There is a postmedian mark connected to lateral band, but sometimes reduced to a small spot. Ventrum dark reddish-brown to black, with yellowish to reddish-brown pronotum and epipleura regions. Ventrum with moderately dense punctation with fine microreticulation. Antennae yellowish to reddish-brown. First two pairs of legs are reddish-brown, whereas hind legs are dark-brown to black in color.

The subspecies andamanicus has a total length of about 13.1 to 15.5 mm. Much darker coloration on head and pronotum than ssp. pacificus. Elytral markings and body colors similar to ssp. pacificus. Hind tarsi more slender with ciliated metatarsomeres. The subspecies conspersus  has a total body length of 14.5 to 16.6 mm. Dark coloration on head less extended. Pale elytral markings are more extended on lateral sides with many dark irrorations. The subspecies lunatus has a total length of 14.3 to 16.8 mm. There is a distinctly enlarged pale postmedian mark on elytron. Subspecies discindens has an oblong-oval, moderately convex body which is broadest distinctly behind middle. Total length is 13.1 to 16.5 mm. Pronotum with a complete dark brown to black longitudinal band in middle.

Biology
After mating, adult female has been observed to deposit eggs singly on the surface of the Salvinia molesta. Newly laid eggs are white in color. Eggs are long ellipsoid with a slight convexity at the ventral side. Egg is about 2.2 mml long.

References

Dytiscidae
Insects of Sri Lanka
Insects described in 1838